Arrecifes Partido is a  partido in the north-east of Buenos Aires Province in Argentina. It is at coordinates .

The district was founded in 1901, and the people are known as arrecifeños.

Sports
Arrecifes is home to Club Atlético Almirante Brown football club.

Towns
Arrecifes
Todd
Viña

States and territories established in 1901
Partidos of Buenos Aires Province
Arrecifes